The Field Maple Acer campestre cultivar 'Compactum' was first described in 1839.

Description
The tree is mop-headed, the crown a mass of tangled branches. Rarely growing to a height of > 3 m, its leaves are similar in shape but slightly smaller than those of the species.

Cultivation
The tree requires assiduous training to restrain its vigorous growth. As with the species, 'Compactum' thrives best in a semi shade position, on a fertile, well-drained soil.

Synonymy
'Compactum' is also known as Acer campestre 'Nanum'.

Accessions

Europe
Sir Harold Hillier Gardens, Ampfield, Hampshire, UK. Acc. nos. 1977.1968, 1977.5384.

References

Field maple cultivars